AKM Mahbubul Islam is a politician from Sirajganj district of Bangladesh. He elected a member of parliament from Pabna-6 in 1979 Bangladeshi general election.

Career 
AKM Mahbubul Islam was elected a Member of Parliament from Pabna-6 constituency as an Bangladesh Nationalist Party candidate in the 1979 Bangladeshi general election.

He was defeated from Sirajganj-6 constituency as a candidate of Bangladesh Nationalist Party in the 7th parliamentary elections on 12 June 1996.

References 

Living people
Year of birth missing (living people)
People from Sirajganj District
Bangladesh Nationalist Party politicians
2nd Jatiya Sangsad members